HD 129357 is a G-type star in the constellation Boötes that is located about 154 light years from the Sun. The measured properties of this star are very similar to those of the Sun, making it a candidate solar twin. However, it has a lower abundance of lithium than the Sun and appears over 3 billion years older, so it may instead be a solar analog. It was suggested by astronomer Olin Eggen that this star is a member of the Wolf 630 moving group of stars that share a common motion through space. The space velocity components of HD 129357 are  = .

References

Boötes
HD, 129357
G-type main-sequence stars
129357
071813
Durchmusterung objects